Kato Symi is a small historic village of Crete, in Heraklion regional unit,  from Ierapetra and  from Heraklion city. Today it belongs to Viannos municipality and borders the Ierapetra municipality. It is dated from the middle Minoan period and had been used for worship for more than 1,000 years. Kato Simi has been destroyed three times, by Arabs, Turks and finally by the German army in World War II, when it was the center of resistance of the Viannos–Ierapetra area against the Nazi occupying forces.

External links
 The Minoan religious sanctuary at Simi

Populated places in Heraklion (regional unit)